Before the existence of ESPN, live coverage of NASCAR Winston Cup races on television was limited. CBS covered the Daytona 500, the June race at Michigan and the July race at Talladega. ABC usually did the Atlanta race in the spring.

List of races televised

1980

On May 29, 1980, CBS paid a fee of roughly US$50,000 or $100,000 to Charlotte Motor Speedway to broadcast the World 600 NASCAR stock car race. Benny Parsons edged out Darrell Waltrip to win a grand prize of $44,850 in a race that was watched by perhaps 3.7 million viewers on the network.

Prior to the original 1999 contract between NASCAR and NBC, the network aired races such as the National 500 at Charlotte Motor Speedway from 1979 to 1981, the 1981 Mountain Dew 500 at Pocono International Raceway, the Winston 500 at Alabama International Motor Speedway from 1983 to 1985, and the Miami 300 and Pennzoil 400 at Homestead-Miami Speedway in both 1999 and 2000.

1981
 

ESPN broadcast its first race in 1981, from North Carolina Motor Speedway (its first live race was later in the year at Atlanta International Raceway), and TNN followed in 1991.  All Cup races were nationally televised by 1985; networks struck individual deals with track owners, and multiple channels carried racing action. Many races were shown taped and edited on Wide World of Sports and syndication services like Mizlou and SETN, but almost all races were live by 1989.

1982
 

From 1982 to 1984, USA Network broadcast the UNO Twin 125s (now the Gander RV Duel).  USA used CBS' crew, graphics and announcers. USA also aired the Atlanta ARCA race in 1985 and televised several NASCAR Busch Series races in the late 1980s.

1983
 

During its coverage of the 1983 Daytona 500, CBS introduced an innovation which director Bob Fishman helped develop – a miniature, remote-controlled in-car camera called RaceCam. Fishman directed every Daytona 500 telecast on CBS, with the exception of 1992, 1994 and 1998 because Fishman was away directing CBS' figure-skating coverage for the Winter Olympics.

TBS broadcast the Richmond spring race, held the week after Daytona Speedweeks, from 1983 to 1995, as well as the fall races at Rockingham (1985-1987), Atlanta (1983-1985) and Riverside (1982-1987).

TNN started showing races live in 1991, but it had aired taped coverage of a few Winston Cup races in the 1980s on its American Sports Cavalcade program.

1984

Special Events Television Network (SETN) is the name of a defunct syndicated television package that broadcast tape delayed NASCAR races from 1984 to 1988. SETN aired races (typically from Martinsville and Pocono as well as from Rockingham, Charlotte, Richmond and Daytona for good measure) that didn't have live television deals at the time. The broadcasts were aired on tape delay because certain promoters still feared that live telecasts would hurt their gate.

1985

1986

1987

1988
 

After SETN folded, one Pocono race a year was produced by Jim Wiglesworth on pay-per-view for Viewer's Choice (now In Demand) from 1988 to 1990. They were not a huge success, as fans were reluctant to pay for what they could see last week for free. The Viewer's Choice shows were noteworthy in that they premiered viewer phone-in questions during the races.

1989

At the 1989 Motorcraft Quality Parts 500 NASCAR event, ESPN/ABC broadcaster Dr. Jerry Punch was reporting from the pit stall of Richard Petty when a fire broke out, injuring two crew members who Punch proceeded to treat on the spot. Following the incident, in which several items of Punch's clothing were singed or melted, ESPN mandated that its pit reporters wear fire-retardant suits. Other networks have since adopted the practice.

References

See also
List of Daytona 500 broadcasters
List of Wide World of Sports (American TV series) announcers
List of events broadcast on Wide World of Sports (American TV series)
NASCAR on television in the 1960s
NASCAR on television in the 1970s
NASCAR on television in the 1990s
NASCAR on television in the 2000s
NASCAR on television in the 2010s

ABC Sports
CBS Sports
NBC Sports
Wide World of Sports (American TV series)
CBS Sports Spectacular
 
Sportsworld (American TV series)
 
 
 
 
 
 
 
 
 
 
ESPN
Turner Sports
Mizlou Television Network
1980s
Showtime Networks
USA Network Sports
1980s in American television